Events in the year 1876 in Brazil.

Incumbents
Monarch – Pedro II
Prime Minister – Duke of Caxias

Events

Births

Deaths

References

 
1870s in Brazil
Years of the 19th century in Brazil
Brazil
Brazil